"Epiphany" (stylized in all lowercase) is a song by American singer-songwriter Taylor Swift. It is the thirteenth track on Swift's eighth studio album, Folklore, which was released on July 24, 2020, through Republic Records. Written by Swift and its producer Aaron Dessner, "Epiphany" honors the services provided by the frontliners of the COVID-19 pandemic, over an ambient-chamber pop composition consisting of a slow piano line, cinematic strings and howling brass.

Swift empathizes with doctors and nurses on "Epiphany", who serve the affected despite their harrowing work and the mental trauma they have to experience while handling loss of human lives, correlating the modern situation with the emotional anguish and physical exhaustion the soldiers of World War II endured, especially her veteran grandfather Dean. Upon release, "Epiphany" received mixed comments from music critics, many of whom praised the song's emotion, themes, lyrics, and Swift's vocal ability, while some found its slow-moving pace and production drowsy. The song reached the top 30 in Australia and Singapore, and top 50 in Canada. It reached number 57 on the US Billboard Hot 100 and number 11 on the Billboard Hot Rock and Alternative Songs chart.

Background and release 

Folklore was conceived by Swift as figments of mythopoeic visuals in her mind, a result of her imagination "running wild" while isolating herself during the COVID-19 pandemic. One such imagery was of her paternal grandfather Dean, who fought at the Battle of Guadalcanal, an American military campaign against Empire of Japan, fought between August 7, 1942, and February 9, 1943, in the World War II. Swift also mentioned another imagery that visualizes "hands held through plastic", in reference to the quarantine protocols that were followed in the pandemic. These two concepts formed the central theme of "Epiphany".

Swift penned "Epiphany", while Aaron Dessner composed its instrumentals and produced the song. On July 23, 2020, Swift announced Folklore and revealed its track listing where "Epiphany" placed at number 13. The album was released on July 24, 2020. As a reference to the song, a picture of Dean is also featured in the music video for the album's second track and lead single, "Cardigan".

Composition and lyrics 

"Epiphany" is an ambient and chamber-pop tune set to a glacial piano, a howling brass and orchestrals. Dessner stated that he imagined "glacial, Icelandic sounds with distended chords and this almost classical feeling" when Swift described the idea of the sound she wanted for "Epiphany". Therefore, Dessner slowed down compositions from different instruments and reversed them to create a "giant stack of harmony", and added piano for a cinematic trope.

Melodically, "Epiphany" is a hymn, displaying Swift's reverent and "angelic" vocals. A homage to healthcare workers during the COVID-19 pandemic, the song's lyrics describe the devastation caused by the pandemic, while deeming doctors and nurses as soldiers on beaches, correlating their emotional distress to that of her veteran grandfather Dean at the Battle of Guadalcanal. In the first verse, Swift sings of Dean on the 1942 battlefield, attending to a soldier bleeding out. In the second verse, she switches to a 2020 medical ward which has patients breathing with difficulty and nurses attending to faltering patients. Swift parallels the pressure both sets of workers endure as they help patients and serve their country while experiencing trauma and witnessing death, and having to reconcile with that to continue serving. The bridge and outro also mention how both workers get "only 20 minutes to sleep" and yet dream "of some epiphany".

Critical reception
"Epiphany" received generally positive reviews from music critics. Sarah Carson, reviewing for I, deemed "Epiphany" a "spectral" track that immortalizes the COVID-19 pandemic. Maura Johnston of Entertainment Weekly also called it spectral, writing that the song is driven by "Swift's exploration of others' inner worlds", which allows her to "take on new voices". The Atlantic writer Spencer Kornhaber dubbed Swift's vocals in the song a "translucent beam", with her syllables falling "slowly like ash". He added that a song like "Epiphany" should not work for "a woman of great privilege" like Swift, who connects two traumas that "aren't her own", but it does work because she "writes with a care and empathy that feel almost priestly". Writing for Slate, Carl Wilson summarized "Epiphany" as a "narratively striking", "topical song" that starts with the image of "an army storming a beach" and then shifts to a modern operating room, where "a woman's vital signs are crashing as someone holds her hand through plastic shielding"; Wilson added that Swift describes these scenes in "warm measured syllables" similar to Kate Bush's 1989 song "This Woman's Work". Annie Zaleski of The A. V. Club wrote that the composition of "Epiphany" echoes the "glacial piano work" by Canadian musician Sarah McLachlan, while the New York Times Jon Caramanica compared it to works by Irish singer Enya.

Kitty Empire of The Observer favored the song's sombre lyricism but disliked the "pillowy" instrumentation. She stated that "Epiphany" incorporates "a medical subplot chiming gently with the suffering being wreaked by coronavirus", dotted with Swift's "emphatic yelps", but its music is a "miasma of gingerly fingered piano and consolatory tonalities", resulting in an unmemorable track. Insider reviewers Callie Ahlgrim and Courteney Larocca named "Epiphany" as their least favorite track on Folklore. Ahlgrim opined that the track contains intriguing vocals and lyrics, but is a "bit snoozy, and a bit too long", while Courteney Larocca complimented its "pretty background music", but downplayed it as "a war drama in song format". However, they agreed that "Epiphany" showcases the versatility in Swift's writing. Katie Moulton, writing for Consequence of Sound, said that "Epiphany" seems to try to "connect periods of global and American crisis, from World War II to COVID-19", but felt that the idea is "muddled". She, however, picked the lyric "Hold your hand through plastic now" as a standout. NME critic Hannah Mylrea found the song "sluggish".

Commercial performance 
Upon the release of Folklore, "Epiphany" debuted at number 57 on the US Billboard Hot 100 chart, number 11 on the Hot Rock & Alternative Songs, and number 24 on the Rolling Stone Top 100. The song further reached the number 29 on Australia's ARIA Singles Chart, number 27 in Singapore's Singles chart, and number 44 on the Canadian Hot 100.

Usage in media 
"Epiphany" appears in the first episode of the second season of American drama television series The Wilds.

Credits and personnel 
Credits are adapted from Tidal and the album booklet.
 Taylor Swift – vocals, songwriting
 Aaron Dessner – songwriting, production, recording, piano, Mellotron, synthesizers and electric guitar
 Bryce Dessner – orchestration
 Dave Nelson – trombone, recording
 Benjamin Lainz – recording
 Yuki Numata Resnick – viola, violin
 Kyle Resnick – trumpet, recording
 Clarice Jensen – cello, recording
 JT Bates – drums, recording
 Jonathan Low – recording
 Laura Sisk – vocal recording
 Serben Ghenea – mixing
 Randy Merrill – mastering
 John Hanes – engineering

Charts

Weekly charts

Year-end charts

References 

2020 songs
Taylor Swift songs
Songs written by Taylor Swift
Songs written by Aaron Dessner
Song recordings produced by Aaron Dessner
Songs about death
Songs about the COVID-19 pandemic
Songs about the military
Ambient songs
Chamber pop songs